Hayao Kinugasa  (February 2, 1915 – February 11, 2007) served in the Imperial Japanese Army and was one of the few ex-Imperial Army officers who joined up with the Japanese Self-Defense Forces (JGSDF) and its predecessor force, namely the National Police Reserve (NPR). In the course of his career, he served in the JSDF's Joint Staff Council and was the first commander of the 1st Airborne Brigade before he retired to private life.

History

Born on February 2, 1915, in Hyōgo Prefecture, he attended the Army's military academy in Narashino in 1936 before graduating in 1941. In 1942, Hayao was an instructor in the Imperial Japanese Army Academy. He was then promoted to Major in 1943 and was later assigned to the Imperial Japanese Army's Imperial General Headquarters from 1944 to 1945.

After the dissolution of the Imperial Japanese Army with the rest of the Imperial Military, Hayao joined up with the NPR in 1951. In 1954, he was instrumental in the eventual formation of the 1st Airborne Brigade and continued to enhance the brigade until 1955. In 1957, he was made captain of this brigade and was eventually made the unit's first commanding officer in 1958. Later, Hayao was assigned to the JSDF's Ground Staff office from 1959-1960. He was then appointed as an instructor in the JGSDF's Aviation School and was an infantry commander of the JGSDF's 3rd Infantry Division in the JGSDF's Middle Army. In 1969, he was made Vice Chief of Staff before appointed as the 9th Chief of Staff after his predecessor resigned due to Yukio Mishima's actions after invading the former Defense Agency in 1970. In 1971, Hayao was appointed as the 9th Chairman of the Joint Chiefs of Staff before retiring to private life in 1973.

Private life

In 1985, Hayao was awarded the Order of the Sacred Treasures for his services in the Japanese Self-Defense Forces. After living years of obscurity in Japanese society, he eventually died on February 11, 2007 of heart failure. He was 91 years old.

References

Chiefs of Staff of the Japan Ground Self-Defense Force
Imperial Japanese Army officers
1915 births
2007 deaths
Military personnel from Hyōgo Prefecture
Japanese military personnel of World War II
Recipients of the Order of the Sacred Treasure, 2nd class